Jason Meadows (born June 9, 1971) is a country music artist signed to Baccerstick Records. He was raised in Calera, Oklahoma. Meadows was a second-place finalist on the third season of the USA Networks talent show Nashville Star. Three singles were released from his debut album 100% Cowboy (the title track, "18 Video Tapes" and "Where Did My Dirt Road Go"), but all failed to chart. The album reached No. 59 on Top Country Albums. "18 Video Tapes" received a "thumbs up" rating from Engine 145, a country music review site. Reviewer Matt C. said, "Here’s a Nashville Star alumnus who didn’t score a major-label deal but nonetheless is producing interesting and compelling music."

Discography

Studio albums

Singles

Music videos

References

American country singer-songwriters
Living people
Nashville Star contestants
Singer-songwriters from Oklahoma
1971 births
21st-century American singers